Zhang Xinqiu is a Chinese sport shooter. She won a gold medal in trap shooting at the 2018 Asian Games.

References

Living people
Chinese female sport shooters
Shooters at the 2018 Asian Games
Medalists at the 2018 Asian Games
Asian Games gold medalists for China
Asian Games medalists in shooting
Year of birth missing (living people)